"Are You Sure Hank Done It This Way"  is a song written and performed by American country music artist Waylon Jennings.  It was released in August 1975 as the first single from the album Dreaming My Dreams.  The song was Waylon Jennings' fourth number one on the country chart as a solo artist.  The single stayed at number one for one week and spent a total of sixteen weeks on the country chart.

The B-side to "Are You Sure ..." was "Bob Wills is Still the King", an often mistaken interpretation by fans as a tribute to the music of Bob Wills and his Texas Playboys, but in all actuality a dig at close friend Willie Nelson as stated by Jennings himself towards the end of his life in the late 1990's in interviews. Although it never charted on its own, "Bob Wills ... " gained airplay and continues to be a staple at classic country radio stations.

Content
The song pays homage to the influence of Hank Williams Sr. in country music, and criticizes the glitz that had come to characterize top-selling country artists in the 1970s, through references to "rhinestone suits" and "new shiny cars."

Chart performance

Waylon Jennings

Alabama

Cover versions
Country band Alabama covered the song in 2010 for the Waylon Jennings tribute album, The Music Inside: A Collaboration Dedicated to Waylon Jennings, Volume One, which was released on February 8, 2011. Alabama's version was released as a single on December 13, 2010, via The Valory Music Co.
Pat Green and Cory Morrow covered the song on the album Songs We Wish We'd Written in 2001.
Clint Black covered the song on his 1999 album D'lectrified, inserting Jennings' name in place of Williams'. Black's version adds an extended instrumental section, and features Jennings as a guest vocalist.
Chequered Past, featuring singer/actor Michael Des Barres, covered this song on their 1984 eponymous album.
Robert Earl Keen contributed a cover of the song to Lonesome, On'ry and Mean: A Tribute to Waylon Jennings.
Morrissey performed a cover of the song at a concert in 2015 in Visalia. It later became the B-Side to his 2018 single "My Love, I'd Do Anything for You".
Jack Ingram performed a cover of the song on the 2003 album Live at Billy Bob's Texas.
Uncle Tupelo released a cover of the song on the 2003 reissue of the album Anodyne.
Hank Williams Jr. released a cover of this song and added/changed lyrics.
The Mavericks cover it on their 2019 album “The Mavericks Play the Hits”.

In popular culture
The song was prominently featured in a Grand Theft Auto V trailer for the wild, hard-living main character Trevor Philips and is also in the video game's soundtrack on the in-game radio station Rebel Radio.
The song is included on "The Highwaymen Live" movie from 1990.
The song was also included on the soundtrack for the 2009 film Crazy Heart.

References

1975 singles
2010 singles
1975 songs
Waylon Jennings songs
Clint Black songs
Pat Green songs
Jack Ingram songs
Alabama (American band) songs
The Mavericks songs
Songs written by Waylon Jennings
RCA Records singles
Songs about Hank Williams